Christian Lundeberg (14 July 1842 – 10 November 1911) was a Swedish politician who served as Prime Minister of Sweden from 2 August to 7 November 1905.

Biography
Lundeberg was born in Valbo, Gävleborg County. He was the son of Johan Ulrik August Lundeberg, a mill owner, and Maria Eckman. He studied at Ultuna and at a military school, and was a Löjtnant (roughly equivalent to lieutenant) from 1861 to 1874, after which he left the military service. He worked at the iron works at Forsbacka bruk, where he was CEO from 1885 to 1906.

He was a member of the First Chamber of Parliament for the conservative and protectionist party, and became its leader in 1899. 

Lundeberg was a leading figure during the parliamentary discussions regarding the union between Sweden and Norway. He was the chairman of a committee that was critical of, and eventually lead to the demise of Johan Ramstedt's government. In June 1905, the King appointed Lundeberg to create a government. He created a coalition government that in September 1905 reached an agreement which allowed Norway to hold a referendum for, or against, independence from Sweden. 

Following the resolution of the Union Crisis, Lundeberg tried to find a mandate to continue with the coalition government in order to resolve the issue of suffrage. When his attempt failed, he went back to being a member of parliament, and was a speaker in the First Chamber of Parliament from 1909 until his death in 1911.

References 

1842 births
1911 deaths
People from Gävle Municipality
Members of the Första kammaren
Prime Ministers of Sweden
Speakers of Första kammaren